Han Kyung-In (born 28 May 1987) is a South Korean football forward who plays for Shan United F.C. in the Myanmar National League.

Club career
Han joined Gyeongnam FC from Myongji University as part of their squad for the 2011 season.  His professional debut came as a second-half substitute in his club's 2011 K-League Cup match against Seongnam Ilhwa Chunma, which ended in a 0 - 0 draw. Within a month, Han scored his first K-League goal in Gyeongnam's 2 - 1 away win over Suwon.

On 27 January 2012, Han moved to fellow K-League side Daejeon Citizen along with his teammate Kim Sun-Kyu.

Club career statistics

References

External links
 
 

1987 births
Association football forwards
South Korean footballers
Gyeongnam FC players
Daejeon Hana Citizen FC players
Gimcheon Sangmu FC players
K League 1 players
K League 2 players
Living people
Sportspeople from Ulsan
Shan United F.C. players
Daejeon Korail FC players
Gyeongju Citizen FC players
Myanmar National League players